Syeda Zohra Tajuddin (24 December 1932 – 20 December 2013) was a Bangladesh Awami League politician. She was a leader of the party and served as its president from 1980 to 1981. She was the wife of the first prime minister Tajuddin Ahmad.

Biography 
Tajuddin was born on 24 December 1932. She studied social science at the University of Dhaka. She married Tajuddin Ahmad in 1959. She kept the Awami league together after the 1975 coup that led to the assassination of the president of Bangladesh and Awami League Sheikh Mujibur Rahman and her husband Tajuddin Ahmad and other high ranking Awami League politicians. She reorganized Awami League after being elected its convener in 1977. She remained a presidium member of the party until her death on 20 December 2013.

Personal life 
Tajuddin had four children. Three daughters, Sharmin Ahmad Reepi, Simeen Hussain Rimi and Mahjabin Ahmad Mimi, and a son, Tanjim Ahmad Sohel Taj. Ex Major Munirul Islam Chowdhury (1st Husband of eldest daughter), Amr Khairy Abdalla (2nd husband of eldest daughter), Keivan Niksejel (husband of youngest daughter).  She was buried at the Banani Graveyard.

References 

1932 births
2013 deaths
University of Dhaka alumni
Awami League politicians
People of the Bangladesh Liberation War
Women in war in Bangladesh
Women in warfare post-1945
Presidents of the Awami League
Burials at Banani Graveyard
20th-century Bengalis
21st-century Bengalis